Richard George (1562 – c. 1613), of Baunton, Gloucestershire, was an English politician.

He was a Member (MP) of the Parliament of England for Cirencester in 1601.

References

1562 births
1613 deaths
English MPs 1601
Members of Parliament for Cirencester